In mathematics, in linear algebra and functional analysis, a cyclic subspace is a certain special subspace of a vector space associated with a vector in the vector space and a linear transformation of the vector space. The cyclic subspace associated with a vector v in a vector space V and a linear transformation T of V is called the  T-cyclic subspace generated by v. The concept of a cyclic subspace is a basic component in the formulation of the cyclic decomposition theorem in linear algebra.

Definition
For the particular case of finite-dimensional spaces, this is equivalent to saying that  is the whole space .
  

There is another equivalent definition of cyclic spaces.

Examples

 If  is the identity operator then every -cyclic subspace is one-dimensional. 
Let . Then . Therefore  and so .

Companion matrix

Then the vectors 

 

Let the characteristic polynomial for  be  

. 

Then 

Therefore, relative to the ordered basis , the operator  is represented by the matrix 

This matrix is called the companion matrix of the polynomial .

See also
 Companion matrix
 Krylov subspace

External links

 PlanetMath: cyclic subspace

References

Linear algebra